Robert Travers Herford B.A., D.D., Litt.D. (1860–1950) was a British Unitarian minister and scholar of rabbinical literature.

He was the grandson of John Gooch Robberds and brother of Professor C. H. Herford, of Manchester University. Herford was educated at Owens College, Manchester, and Manchester New College, London (B.A. 1880) Then, as a Hibbert Scholar, he studied at the University of Leiden. From 1914 to 1925 he was librarian of Dr Williams's Library, Grafton Street, London.

In 1886 Herford's first effort in Talmudics appeared in an article on "The Jerusalem Talmud" contributed to The Christian Reformer.

He was noted as one of the first Christian scholars of the Pharisees to take a neutral view between Talmud and New Testament.

Works
 Christianity in Talmud and Midrash, 1903
Pharisaism: Its Aim and Its Method, 1912
 "What the World Owes to the Pharisees", The Menorah Journal, 1919
 Ethics of the Talmud: Sayings of the Fathers, 1962

References

External links
 
 

English Unitarian ministers
1860 births
1950 deaths
Alumni of Harris Manchester College, Oxford